Aliabad Parsaneh (also Romanized as ‘Alīābād-e Porsāneh and ‘Alīābād Parsaneh; also known as ‘Alīābād and ‘Alīābād-e Parmān) is a village in Zagheh Rural District, Zagheh District, Khorramabad County, Lorestan Province, Iran. At the 2006 census, its population was 47, in 11 families.

References 

Towns and villages in Khorramabad County